Kenji Yanobe (ヤノベケンジ Yanobe Kenji) is a Japanese contemporary artist known for his upbeat yet dystopian artwork.  His sculpture simulates consumer products designed for survival after a  nuclear holocaust.

He is a professor at Kyoto University of Art and Design. He is also the director of Ultra Factory there.

He was born in Ibaraki City, Osaka. After graduating from high school, he studied at Kyoto City University of Arts in 1989, majoring in sculpture. 
After studying at the Royal College of Art in England for a short time, he completed the Graduate School of Kyoto City University of Arts in 1991.

Artwork
Yanobe's sculptures closely fit a modern Japanese consumer aesthetic.  His pieces, often based on robots, appear to be the products of the most modern industrial design: bright colors, polished metal, articulable joints, and shiny finish.  However, they betray a fear of nuclear war.  Yanobe's artwork includes brightly colored hazmat suits and tiny action figures with built-in  geiger counters.  They pose the question: Would life after a nuclear war be possible, and if it were, would it be worth living?

Yanobe has had art shows throughout the world, including the United States, Europe, and his native Japan.  His artwork was displayed at the grounds of the 1970 World's Fair in Osaka, Japan.  It was the last show there before the site was taken down in March 2004.

In 2009, he won the Osaka Culture Prize.

External links
Kenji Yanobe's official website
Interview with Kenji Yanobe in Giant Robot magazine.
Biography ExhibitionCV of Kenji Yanobe on Azito (online gallery of Japanese Contemporary art).

Living people
People from Ibaraki, Osaka
Japanese sculptors
Japanese contemporary artists
Japanese pop artists
Year of birth missing (living people)
Artists from Osaka Prefecture